Dulha Dulhan is a 1964 Indian Bollywood film produced and directed by Ravindra Dave. It stars Raj Kapoor and Sadhana Shivdasani in pivotal roles together for the first time.

Soundtrack

References

External links

1960s Hindi-language films
1964 films
Films scored by Kalyanji Anandji